Toni Eskelinen (born January 18, 1995) is a Finnish ice hockey goaltender. He is currently playing with Lahti Pelicans in the Finnish Liiga.

Eskelinen made his Liiga debut playing with Oulun Kärpät during the 2012–13 Liiga season.

References

External links

1995 births
Living people
Finnish ice hockey goaltenders
Lahti Pelicans players
Oulun Kärpät players
Sportspeople from Oulu